The Division of Phillip was an Australian Electoral Division in the state of New South Wales. It was located in the Sydney's eastern suburbs, and was named after Captain Arthur Phillip, captain of the First Fleet and first Governor of New South Wales. The Division included the suburbs of Bondi, Coogee, Kensington and Randwick.

The Division was proclaimed at the redistribution of 11 May 1949, and was first contested at the 1949 Federal election. It was abolished prior to the 1993 Federal election.  It was a marginal seat that from 1963 onward was held by the governing party of the day.

Members

Election results

Phillip
1993 disestablishments in Australia
Constituencies disestablished in 1993
Constituencies established in 1949
1949 establishments in Australia